Henry Hodgkins or Hodgkyns (by 1522 – 1569/70), of Winchcombe and Hailes, Gloucestershire, was an English politician.

He was a Member (MP) of the Parliament of England for Bath in 1555.

References

1569 deaths
English MPs 1555
People from Winchcombe
Year of birth uncertain